John McBain may refer to:

 John McBain (musician) (born 1965), American musician
 John McBain (One Life to Live), character on the American soap operas One Life to Live and General Hospital
 Jock McBain (1882-1941), Scottish trade unionist and political activist

See also
John Bain (disambiguation)